Generation Kill is an American seven-part television miniseries produced for HBO that aired from July 13 to August 24, 2008. It is based on Evan Wright's 2004 book Generation Kill, about his experience as an embedded reporter with the US Marine Corps' 1st Reconnaissance Battalion during the 2003 invasion of Iraq, and was adapted for television by David Simon, Ed Burns, and Wright. The miniseries was directed by Susanna White and Simon Cellan Jones and produced by Andrea Calderwood. The ensemble cast includes Alexander Skarsgård as Sergeant Brad 'Iceman' Colbert, James Ransone as Corporal Josh Ray Person, and Lee Tergesen as Wright.

Production
The cable channel HBO gave the go-ahead to a seven-part miniseries, based on Evan Wright's book about his experiences as an embedded reporter with the U.S. Marine Corps' 1st Reconnaissance Battalion during the Iraq War's first phase. The series is set during the invasion of Iraq, from late March to early April 2003. The miniseries was shot over a six-month shoot from mid-to-late 2007 in South Africa, Mozambique, and Namibia.  The primary production value aspired to was authenticity. The miniseries was produced on a budget of $56 million.

Crew
David Simon and Ed Burns co-wrote and executive produced the miniseries alongside Company Pictures' George Faber and Charles Pattinson, and HBO's Anne Thomopoulos. Andrea Calderwood was the producer; Nina Noble served as co-executive producer; author Evan Wright was credited as a consulting producer; Susanna White and Simon Cellan Jones directed the episodes; and two former U.S. Marines, Eric Kocher and Rudy Reyes, served as the production's military advisors as well as starred in the series.

Cast and characters

There are 28 starring cast members with a large supporting cast. The majority of the characters were drawn from the Second Platoon of the First Reconnaissance Battalion's Bravo Company. Lee Tergesen played embedded reporter Evan Wright, though throughout the series he is only referred to as "reporter" or "Rolling Stone". Wright was assigned to the lead vehicle of Bravo Company, which he shared with Staff Sergeant Brad "Iceman" Colbert, played by Alexander Skarsgård, Corporal Josh Ray Person, played by James Ransone and Lance Corporal Harold James Trombley, played by Billy Lush. To prepare for their roles as Recon Marines, the cast attended a six-day boot camp led by Eric Kocher and Rudy Reyes.

Other starring characters, from 2nd platoon include:
 
 Stark Sands as First lieutenant Nathaniel Fick
 Marc Menchaca as Gunnery sergeant Mike "Gunny" Wynn
 Jon Huertas as Sergeant Antonio "Poke" Espera
 Mike Figueroa as Sergeant Leandro "Shady B" Baptista
 Josh Barrett as Sergeant Larry Shawn "Pappy" Patrick
 Sergeant Rodolfo "Rudy" Reyes as himself
 Jonah Lotan as Hospital corpsman Second Class Robert Timothy "Doc" Bryan
 Wilson Bethel as Corporal Evan "Q-Tip" Stafford
 Pawel Szajda as Corporal Walt Hasser
 Rey Valentin as Corporal Gabriel "Gabe" Garza
 Sean Brosnan as Corporal Daniel Redman
 Kellan Lutz as Corporal Jason Lilley
 Rich McDonald as Corporal Anthony "Manimal" Jacks
 Eric Ladin as Corporal James Chaffin
 Daniel Fox as Private First Class John Christeson

Additional characters;
 Robert John Burke as Major general James "Chaos" Mattis, commanding officer of 1st Marine Division
 Chance Kelly as Lieutenant colonel Stephen "Godfather" Ferrando, commanding officer of the First Reconnaissance Battalion
 Benjamin Busch as Major Todd Eckloff, executive officer of the battalion
 Michael Kelly as Captain Bryan Patterson, commanding officer of Alpha Company
 Brian Patrick Wade as Captain Craig "Encino Man" Schwetje, commanding officer of Bravo Company
 Eric Nenninger as Captain Dave "Captain America" McGraw, the erratic commanding officer of 3rd platoon, Bravo company
 Neal Jones as Sergeant major John Sixta, a loudmouth Battalion SNCO
 David Barrera as Gunnery sergeant Ray Griego, Bravo Company's operations chief
 Owain Yeoman as Sergeant Eric Kocher, a long-suffering team leader under the command of "Captain America". The real-life Eric Kocher portrays another Marine (Gunnery Sergeant Rich Barrott) who drives Captain Patterson's command Humvee in Alpha.
 J. Salome Martinez Jr. as Corporal Jeffrey "Dirty Earl" Carazales
 Nabil Elouahabi as "Meesh", the battalion translator

Episodes

Soundtrack
Although the series has no score, it features a large collection of music, much of it songs that were popular among the American populace in late 2002 and early 2003. The newer music (in the show's context) serves to illustrate pop culture during the time of the invasion. All of the songs are sung a cappella by cast members, with the exception of Johnny Cash's "The Man Comes Around" and Josh Ray Person's "Re-Up Time".

Episode 1: "Get Some"
"Merry Christmas from the Family", by Robert Earl Keen
"Sk8er Boi", by Avril Lavigne
"Lovin' You", by Minnie Riperton
"Use Me", by Bill Withers

Episode 2: "The Cradle of Civilization"
"Beyoğlu", by D.J. Kambo
"The Marines' Hymn", Traditional
"Smoke Signals", by Dada Flair
"Complicated", by Avril Lavigne
"Bodies", by Drowning Pool
"Boyz-n-the-Hood", by Dynamite Hack
"Hot in Herre", by Nelly

Episode 3: "Screwby"
"Hot in Herre", by Nelly
"It Was a Good Day", by Ice Cube
"Tainted Love", by Ed Cobb

Episode 4: "Combat Jack"
"The "Fish" Cheer/I-Feel-Like-I'm-Fixin'-to-Die Rag", by Country Joe and the Fish
"Attahaddiat", by Kadhum Al Sahir
"Entaha Almeshwar", by Kadhum Al Sahir
"Copenhagen Song", by Josh Ray Person
"Teenage Dirtbag", by Wheatus

Episode 5: "A Burning Dog"
"On the Road Again", by Willie Nelson
"Sundown", by Gordon Lightfoot
"My Cherie Amour", by Stevie Wonder
"Gangsta Gangsta", by N.W.A

Episode 6: "Stay Frosty"
"It Ain't Easy", by Tupac Shakur
"Let Me Ride", by Dr. Dre
"Fuck tha Police", by N.W.A
"Mammas Don't Let Your Babies Grow Up to Be Cowboys", by Ed Bruce
"Can I Kick It?", by A Tribe Called Quest
"So Fresh, So Clean", by Outkast

Episode 7: "Bomb in the Garden"
"9 to 5 (Morning Train)", by Sheena Easton
"Come Sail Away", by Styx
"King of the Road", by Roger Miller
"Re-Up Time", by Josh Ray Person
"The Man Comes Around", by Johnny Cash

Reception

Critical response
The miniseries received very positive reviews from critics. On Metacritic, it received a score of 80 out of 100 based on 27 reviews, indicating "generally favorable reviews". On Rotten Tomatoes, the miniseries has an approval rating of 86% based on 42 reviews, with an average rating of 9.1/10. The critical consensus reads, "Generation Kill plunges the viewer into war with a visceral force that's still somehow reined in by masterful storytelling and a strong command of period details."

Entertainment Weekly gave the series an "A−" rating, and critic Ken Tucker remarked favorably on its avoidance of cliché, self-consciousness, and agenda-driven storytelling, and praised its execution, nuance, and verisimilitude. Robert Bianco of USA Today wrote: "the seven-part Generation Kill is what you'd hope for from the people behind The Wire: an honest, barely adorned, sometimes painfully vivid representation of life as we live it now. It's journalism converted to art, with both benefiting". Austin Smith of the New York Post, however, was not as impressed; he described the series "as dull and throbbing as a severe headache".

A red carpet screening of Generation Kill was held for U.S. Marines at Camp Pendleton in California, where the series was favorably received.

Accolades

References

External links

 
 

Iraq War in television
War television series
2000s American television miniseries
Television shows about the United States Marine Corps
HBO original programming
Television shows written by David Simon
Television series by All3Media
Television shows set in Iraq
American military television series
Television shows based on non-fiction books